Clergé was the greatest player of real tennis in the mid 18th century, with the height of his career being about 1753 in France.  He is credited with being the first world champion of any sport, holding the real tennis title from 1740 until 1765, when Raymond Masson succeeded him.  He was particularly good in a four-handed game.  Also known to history as Clergé de Elder, the dates of his birth and death are unknown.

References

 Noel, Evan Baillie and J. O. M. Clark. A History of Tennis, p. 129, Oxford University Press, 1924. 
 Real Tennis World Championship 2004 Program, p. 5, National Tennis Club, Newport, Rhode Island.

French real tennis players
History of tennis
Year of birth unknown
Year of death unknown